Alanyurt (literally "field homeland") is a Turkish place name that may refer to the following places in Turkey:

 Alanyurt, Güzelyurt, a village in the district of Güzelyurt, Aksaray Province
 Alanyurt, İscehisar, a village in the district of İscehisar, Afyonkarahisar Province
 Alanyurt, Kale